Aktogay Mine is a copper mine under production in the Karaganda Region (Қарағанды облысы) of Kazakhstan. It is an "open-pit" type quarry currently under development. It will contain an open pit, as well as a concentrator to produce copper cathodes, although molybdenum is also expected to be extracted as well. The site contains a large copper deposit, as well as a molybdenum-rich sulfide deposit. It is expected to contain around 123 million tonnes of copper, as well as another 2.063 billion tons of sulfide-molybdenum. The projected cost to build it is somewhere around $2.3 billion.

References 

Karaganda
Copper mines in Kazakhstan